Kesht Zaran (also Romanized as Kesht Zārān) is a village in Pishkuh-e Mugui Rural District, in the Central District of Fereydunshahr County, Isfahan Province, Iran. At the 2006 census, its population was 21, in 4 families.

References 

Populated places in Fereydunshahr County